Joyce Echaquan was a 37-year-old Atikamekw woman who died on September 28, 2020, in the Centre Hospitalier de Lanaudière in Saint-Charles-Borromée, Quebec. Before her death, she recorded a Facebook Live video that showed her screaming in distress and healthcare workers abusing her whilst assuming her to be a drug addict and experiencing withdrawal symptoms in what has been widely described as a racist incident.

Background 
Echaquan, a mother of seven from Manawan, had been frequently visiting the hospital since 2014. She had prior heart complications that required a pacemaker.

Due to her distrusting medical staff and not being fluent in French, Echaquan would record Facebook Live videos during her hospital visits and have a cousin translate. Another cousin said that Echaquan would often talk about medical staff seeming "fed up" with her and would only make sure she was not in pain, rather than actually treating her.

Incident 
Echaquan was admitted to the hospital on September 26, 2020, for stomach pains. She was restrained to her bed, as  it is alleged she requested, although the  coroner expressed doubt to this allegation, calling it "absurd", and given morphine on September 28, despite her concerns that she would have an adverse reaction to it.

Echaquan live-streamed for seven minutes on September 28. During the Livestream, at least two hospital employees are heard insulting her in French. While Echaquan was moaning in pain, an employee asked her if she is "done acting stupid." Another employee told Echaquan that she "made some bad choices" and asked what her children would be thinking if they saw her, where she quietly responded with: "That's why I came here." Echaquan was also told that she is only "good for sex," the employees were the ones "paying for this," and that she was "stupid as hell." When the nurse realised that the conversations between her and her colleague are being recorded she grabbed the phone and attempted to delete the recording. Mrs Echaquan died later that day of a pulmonary edema. According to her family, she was allergic to morphine.

One employee, a nurse, was dismissed from the hospital on September 29. A second employee, an orderly, was dismissed on October 1.

Previous incident 
Another incident where Echaquan was mistreated by hospital staff happened in late August 2020.

33-year-old Jennifer Mac Donald, a patient attendant at a local Alzheimer's centre who was at the hospital to support her father, overheard Echaquan screaming in a nearby cubicle and expressing concerns about her treatment. Mac Donald described Echaquan's medical attendants as "indifferent and verbally aggressive," she said they were ignoring her pleas, and she also overheard a nurse ask: "Will she ever shut up?" At one point, she approached Echaquan in order to see if she could help her, but the staff told her to "mind her own business."

Mac Donald did not know that the woman who was being mistreated in August was Echaquan until she saw the Facebook Live video and recognized her.

Reactions 

The premier of Quebec, François Legault, condemned the medical staff's comments about Echaquan and called them "racist". However, he denied the existence of systemic racism in Quebec and he also claimed that he was not involved in her death.

Canadian Prime Minister Justin Trudeau called the incident "the worst form of racism" and "systemic racism."

Marc Miller, the Canadian federal Minister of Indigenous Services, met Echaquan's son, Thomas-James, and apologized to her family for the incident.

The director of the Lanaudière health board Daniel Castonguay was removed from his position in December 2020. The new CEO of the health board since April 2021, Maryse Poupart, said she was a "person of action" and gave condolences to Echaquan's family while promising to prioritize relations with Indigenous patients.

Investigation 

The Quebec coroner's office confirmed on September 29 that they would be investigating the circumstances of Echaquan's death. The hearings are expected to begin in 2021. The local health authority, CISSS de Lanaudière, also has launched its own investigation.

The Minister of Indigenous Services confirmed October 8, that a meeting of Federal ministers and Indigenous leaders is planned. The meeting will include Crown-Indigenous Relations Minister Carolyn Bennett, Health Minister Patty Hajdu, Justice Minister David Lametti and Minister of Rural Economic Development Maryam Monsef.

Echaquan's family is planning to take legal action.

The three-week coroner inquiry by the coroner, Géhane Kame, ended in June, with over 2,000 people marching in Trois-Rivières as well as other marches and vigils across Quebec. In September 2021 after  the inquiry, the coroner, Géhane Kamel, reported that Echaquan's death was an "undeniable" case of racism and preventable,  and that "racism and prejudice Ms. Echaquan faced" was a contributor to her death.  She called upon the Quebec government to recognize systemic racism existed  and to "make the commitment to contribute to its elimination.". The coroner's official cause of death was pulmonary edema, also stating that the medical staff had incorrectly assumed she was suffering from drug withdraw.

References

See also 
 Joyce Echaquan on Wikipetcia in Atikamekw language

2020 deaths
Anti-Indigenous racism in Canada
Atikamekw people
Deaths by person in Canada
Indigenous health in Canada
Race and health